Andile Sibabalwe Fiphaza (born 25 November 1994), professionally known as Zoocci Coke Dope (or simply as Zoocci) is a South African record producer, rapper, singer, and audio engineer. Almost all of his productions begin with the tag "Zoocci Coke Dope! He's the dealer". Zoocci's debut album, Anxiety, was released on 25 November 2019. The follow up album, Anxiety+ was released on 25 February 2022. He won the Producer of the Year award at the South African Hip Hop Awards 2021.

Albums

Studio albums

Mixtapes

Awards and nominations

References

External links 
 
 

1994 births
Living people
People from Gauteng
South African rappers
South African hip hop musicians
South African record producers